Thomas Lüthi (born 6 September 1986) is a Swiss sporting director at Prüstel GP, and former Grand Prix motorcycle racer. He spent 19 years in Grand Prix world championships, becoming one of only six riders to reach 300 race starts, spending much of his career with the Interwetten Paddock team, with who he became the 2005 season's 125cc world champion.

Career

Early career
Lüthi was born in Oberdiessbach, Kanton Bern, Switzerland, but grew up in Emmental. Lüthi started racing pocket bikes at the age of nine. He won pocket bike championships in 1999 and 2000. In 2002, he finished second overall in the European 125cc Championship, and third in the German 125cc series.

125cc World Championship
Lüthi made his first 125cc World Championship appearance at the 2002 German Grand Prix, which he finished in 26th place.

In the 2003 Grand Prix motorcycle racing season, Lüthi was invited by Daniel Epp to ride for his team, known as the "Elit Grand Prix Team"; Epp became his manager. Lüthi scored his first podium in Barcelona and ended in second place. In 2004, he retired from four races in a row, missed four races because of injury, and scored 14 points.

Andy Ibbott of California Superbike School started training Thomas during the 2005 season. Lüthi scored his first 125cc class Grand Prix win in 2005 at Le Mans, followed by three more victories that season, including one at his team's home race at Brno, Czech Republic. On 6 November 2005 Lüthi secured his first world championship in the 125cc class, the sixth-youngest person to do so; this took place at Valencia. While using a Honda RS125R kit, Lüthi won the world championship title in the 125cc class, being five points ahead of Mika Kallio. Lüthi was voted Swiss sportsman of the year in 2005 and also won the annual "Swiss Award" in the category of sport.

After winning the 2005 125cc World Championship, he was partnered by Sandro Cortese of Germany and the team name was changed to "Elit — Caffè Latte". He scored his only win and only podium of the season at the 2006 French Grand Prix. He lost his championship title to Álvaro Bautista.

250cc World Championship
After the 2006 season, Lüthi moved on to 250cc. The team changed their name to "Emmi — Caffè Latte", and defected to Aprilia, racing on the Aprilia RSA 250.

For 2008, Lüthi continued with the Aprilia RSA 250. Daniel Epp also ran an Aprillia LE for Lukáš Pešek, under the Auto Kelly - CP branding. Lüthi did not have any podiums until the 2008 Italian GP, where he finished at the podium in third place. At Assen, he finished in second place behind Álvaro Bautista. At Brno, Lüthi crashed out of the race due to an apparent brake failure.

In 2009, he finished seventh overall in 250cc, although without a podium.

Moto2 World Championship

For 2010, he remained with the team in the Moto2 class that replaced the 250cc category. At Silverstone, Lüthi finished in second place. Lüthi finished in third place at Assen, which was a position he acquired on the last lap after being in first place earlier in the race. Lüthi had a collarbone injury during those two races.

MotoGP World Championship
On 24 August 2017, it was announced that Lüthi would move up to MotoGP for the 2018 season, partnering Moto2 title rival Franco Morbidelli at EG 0,0 Marc VDS. Lüthi did not score a single point throughout his first MotoGP campaign, with his best result being 16th place at Losail, Le Mans, Brno, Phillip Island, and Sepang.

Return to Moto2

On 12 August 2018, it was announced that Lüthi would step back to Moto2 for the 2019 season, joining Dynavolt Intact GP. He replaced Xavi Vierge, who moved to Marc VDS.

Retirement
On 19 August 2021, he announced his retirement from racing after the  season. He will take on the role of Sports Director of the Prüstel GP Moto3 team, as well as their Junior Team, starting 2022.

Career statistics

Grand Prix motorcycle racing

By season

By class

Races by year
(key) (Races in bold indicate pole position, races in italics indicate fastest lap)

References

External links

  
  Tom Lüthi ist der «Star des Jahres» von www.startalk.ch 
  Radio Basilisk-Interview nach dem 1. Sieg in Le Mans (wma, schweizerdeutsch) 

1986 births
Swiss motorcycle racers
125cc World Championship riders
250cc World Championship riders
Living people
Moto2 World Championship riders
Marc VDS Racing Team MotoGP riders
MotoGP World Championship riders
People from Bern-Mittelland District
Sportspeople from the canton of Bern
125cc World Riders' Champions